An international identifier is a number of different size which comes above or beside the national identification number and helps to identify a company over several countries in the world.

See also
 DUNS NUMBER
 EasyNumber
 European Business Register Network
 International Suppliers Network
 ISO 9362 (Business Identifier Code)
 Legal Entity Identifier
 Unified Business Identifier (UBI)

References

Unique identifiers